Vesa Lennart Kanniainen (born March 13, 1948 in Rovaniemi) is a professor of economics at the University of Helsinki.

Biography 
Vesa Kanniainen studied at the London School of Economics in 1972–73, working within macroeconomic theory and monetary economics, topics that he was also teaching as Visiting Assistant Professor at Brown University and Washington State University in 1977–79. Most of his academic life, he has been working at the University of Helsinki. In research, he subsequently moved to dynamic investment models, including tax effects and he started to teach corporate finance. Later, he has given some courses at Uppsala University, University of Munich and at Hamburg University. He is a research fellow at CESifo in Munich.

Academic work
His most highly cited paper:
Kanniainen, V., & Keuschnigg, C. (2003). The optimal portfolio of start-up firms in venture capital finance. Journal of Corporate Finance, 9(5), 521-534.
has been cited 325 times according to Google Scholar.

His second most cited paper:
Kanniainen, V., & Keuschnigg, C. (2004). Start-up investment with scarce venture capital support. Journal of Banking & Finance, 28(8), 1935-1959.
has been cited 255 times.

Other works
He also writes and publishes short stories and poems:
 Vaaroja Vapautta Viettelyksiä, VK World 2004, Yliopistopaino , Helsinki 2004.
 Jos voisin mä elämäni lauluksi laulaa. Nuoren miehen runoja ajalta, jolloin Suomi syntyi, poems by Juho Oskari Rautio (1885–1969), editing and preface Vesa Kanniainen, Yliopistopaino , Helsinki 2001.

References

External links
 Home page
 YRITTÄJYYDEN VAHVISTAMINEN JA SEN MERKITYS RAKENTEELLISEN TYÖTTÖMYYDEN KANNALTA

1948 births
Living people
People from Rovaniemi
20th-century Finnish economists
Economics educators
Alumni of the London School of Economics
Academic staff of the University of Helsinki
Brown University faculty
Academic staff of the Ludwig Maximilian University of Munich
Washington State University faculty
21st-century Finnish economists